Roy Eisenhardt (born 1939) is a lawyer and former president of the Oakland Athletics and member of the Haas family of San Francisco.

Biography
Eisenhardt was born to a middle-class, Catholic family and grew up in South Orange, New Jersey, the son of Catheryn T. and Emil Henry Eisenhardt.  His father was the director of purchasing at a local university and his mother was a professor of English and Linguistics. His paternal grandfather was an immigrant from Germany. He has one brother and one sister. He attended Columbia High School in Maplewood, New Jersey and then graduated from Dartmouth College in 1960. After school he served two years in the United States Marine Corps in Okinawa before returning to the United States to attend law school at UC Berkeley School of Law where he graduated in 1965. He then went to Germany to study tax law and upon returning, worked in business law at the firm of Farella, Braun, & Martel in San Francisco and then in 1975, he began teaching at UC Berkeley School of Law. In 1980, he served as president of Major League Baseball's Oakland Athletics then owned by his father-in-law, Walter A. Haas Jr. who he had helped to negotiate the purchase of the A's from Charles O. Finley for $12.7 million.  He served as president from 1981 to 1986.

Personal life
In 1965, he married fellow attorney Auban Slay; they divorced in 1976. In 1978, he married Betsy Haas, daughter of businessman Walter A. Haas Jr. and Evelyn Danzig Haas. They have two children: Jesse Eisenhardt and Sarah Eisenhardt. Jesse is a cinematographer and director; he is married to attorney Allison Hoover who serves on the board of the San Francisco CASA (Court Appointed Special Advocates) and with her father-in-law on the board of the Sutter Health California Pacific Medical Center Foundation.

References

1939 births
Haas family
American people of German descent
Columbia High School (New Jersey) alumni
Major League Baseball team presidents
Oakland Athletics executives
People from South Orange, New Jersey
Dartmouth College alumni
UC Berkeley School of Law alumni
UC Berkeley School of Law faculty
Living people
Newmark family